Sophronisca nigra is a species of beetle in the family Cerambycidae. It was described by Lepesme and Stephan von Breuning in 1952.

References

Desmiphorini
Beetles described in 1952